Yevgeni Veniaminovich Malofeyev (born 27 April 1993) is a Russian football goalkeeper.

Club career
He made his debut in the Russian Second Division for FC Sibir-2 Novosibirsk on 27 August 2012 in a game against FC Chita.

He made his Russian Football National League debut for FC Sibir Novosibirsk on 11 March 2013 in a game against FC Ufa.

References

External links
 
 
 Career summary by sportbox.ru

1993 births
People from Krasnokamensky District
Living people
Russian footballers
Association football goalkeepers
FC Sibir Novosibirsk players
FC Dynamo Barnaul players
FC Novokuznetsk players
FC Strogino Moscow players
Sportspeople from Zabaykalsky Krai